Mildred "Millie" Louise McDaniel-Singleton ( McDaniel, November 4, 1933 – September 30, 2004) was an American athlete, who competed mainly in the women's high jump event during her career.

Born in Atlanta, Georgia, she attended David T. Howard High School. She competed for the United States at the 1956 Summer Olympics held in Melbourne, Australia where she won the gold medal in the women's high jump event.  In the process, she  beat the current world record holder, Iolanda Balas and set a new world record.

She attended the Tuskegee Institute where she played basketball.  While there she was the National Champion in 1953, 1955 and 1956. In 1983 she was inducted into the Georgia Sports Hall of Fame.

Death
McDaniel-Singleton died of cancer, aged 70, in Pasadena, California.

References

External links
 
 
 
 
 
  (cites November 3, 1933 as date of birth)

1933 births
2004 deaths
African-American female track and field athletes
American female high jumpers
Athletes (track and field) at the 1955 Pan American Games
Athletes (track and field) at the 1956 Summer Olympics
Medalists at the 1956 Summer Olympics
Olympic gold medalists for the United States in track and field
Pan American Games gold medalists for the United States
Pan American Games medalists in athletics (track and field)
Track and field athletes from Atlanta
Medalists at the 1955 Pan American Games
20th-century African-American women
20th-century African-American sportspeople
21st-century African-American people
21st-century African-American women